Cranford, New Jersey was incorporated on March 14, 1871. The mayor is the chief elected official in the Township of Cranford, in Union County, New Jersey .  The township elects five commissioners at-large to three-year terms, and the members of the township committee elect one of their own as mayor and one as deputy mayor for one-year terms. The mayor of Cranford is the chairman of the township committee and presides over meetings, sets agendas, oversees township government, and performs ceremonial functions.  The mayor has the same one vote as other commissioners and is a part-time ceremonial function.  The mayor of Cranford possesses other duties assigned to mayors under New Jersey law. Daniel Aschenbach was mayor 4 times.  Terms are for the calendar year given unless otherwise noted. The mayors are as follows:

Mayors of Cranford, New Jersey
Sylvester Cahill, Sr. – 1871. Sylvester Cahill, Sr. was the first mayor of Cranford, New Jersey.
Alexander Purves (mayor) – 1872 – April 1875 Grggg
Henry Harrison (Cranford mayor) – April 1875 – 1876
Charles Leo Abry – 1877
James McGowen (mayor) – 1878
William Wood (mayor) – 1879
Alexander Purves (mayor) – 1880
William Wood (mayor) – 1881
John Banker – 1882
William Wood (mayor) – 1883–1884
Edward Beadle, Sr. – 1885
Charles Leo Abry – 1886–1887
Robert Rindell – 1888
George Littell – 1889 – March 1890
Robert Rindell – March – December 1890
Jaspur Hunt – 1891
Edmund Horton – 1892–1895
Jasper Hunt – 1896–1898
John Cromwell – 1899–1900
James C. W. Rankin – 1901. This was his first term.
William Hall – January – April 1902
James C. W. Rankin – April – December 1902. This was his second term.
Edmund Horton – 1903–1908
James C. W. Rankin- January – June 1909. This was his third term.
John Heins – July 1909 – 1916
George Moon – 1917–1918
John Roach – 1919–1924
Roger Aldrich – 1925–1931
George Lutz – 1932–1933
George Osterheldt – 1934–1951
Emory Stanley – 1952
Fred Andersen – 1953–1956
John L Brennan – 1957–1958
Ira Dorian – 1959–1960
C. Van Chamberlin – 1961
Nicholas St. John LaCorte – 1962–1963
H. Raymond Kirwin – 1964–1965
Wesley Philo – 1966
Edward Kent Gill – 1967–1969 
Malcolm Pringle – 1970–1971
Jack McVey – 1972–1973
Henry Hinsenkamp, Jr. – 1974
Burton Goodman – 1975
Daniel Mason – 1976
Barbara Brande – 1977
Ronald Marotta – 1978
Raymond Molnar – 1979
Henry Dreyer – 1980
Gene Marino – 1981
Richard Salway – 1982
Edward Robinson – 1983
Gene Marino – 1984
Douglas Nordstrom – 1985–1986
Paul Lacorte – 1987
Vincent Brinkerhoff – 1988
Edwin Force – 1989–1991
Edward Robinson – 1992
Daniel Aschenbach – 1993
Carolyn Vollero – 1994
Norman Albert – 1995
J. Robert Hoeffler – 1996–1997
Wally Shackell Jr. – 1998
Thomas Denny – 1999
Philip J. Morin III – 2000
George Jorn – 2001
Barbara Bilger – 2002
Daniel Aschenbach – 2003
Barbara Bilger – 2004
George Jorn – 2005
Daniel Aschenbach – 2006
Michael Plick – 2007
Robert I. Puhak – 2008
David W. Robinson – 2009
Mark C. Smith – 2010
Daniel Aschenbach – 2011
David W. Robinson – 2012
Thomas Hannen, Jr. – 2013
Andis Kalnins – 2014–2016
Thomas Hannen, Jr. – 2017–2018
Patrick Giblin – 2019–2020
Kathleen Miller Prunty – 2021–present

References

 
Cranford